Vejalka is a village in Ranpur Taluka of Botad district in Gujarat, India. An archeological site was found and excavated near this village in 2014.

Archeology
The site is located 50 km from Lothal which is major archeological site of the region. There are around 190 Harappan sites in the state, most in Kutch and Saurashtra region.

The excavation at the site started in 2014 and extended for two years. The excavation was carried out by students and teachers of Department of Archaeology and Ancient History, Maharaja Sayajirao University of Baroda. The settlement belonged to Indus Valley civilization which is dated 2300 BC to 2000 BC. It is a rural centre which supplied raw material to urban centres.

During the excavation, the archeologists found a large number of pottery, animal bones, mud walls, beads and stone blades. The beads and stone blades suggested that there was a small scale industry at the site. The mud structures informs about domestic architecture of the time. The also found micaceous red ware, a kind of ceramic, in abundance which confirmed the existence of Indus valley civilization.

The neighbour villages of Vejalka are Chandarva and Bhimnath.

References

2.    Train no.59534 Bhavnagar to Surendranagar train stop.

3.  Train no.59233 Surendranagar to Bhavnagar train stop

History of Gujarat
Archaeological sites in Gujarat
Former populated places in India
Indus Valley civilisation sites